Mycetophila fungorum is a Palearctic species of  'fungus gnats' in the family Mycetophilidae. Mycetophila fungorum is found in forest or wooded areas where the larvae develop  in Agaricales  and also obtained with emergence traps over dead wood,  soil and ground flora.

References

External links
Images representing  Mycetophila  fungorum at BOLD

Mycetophilidae